The Mizoram Ground Snake (Blythia hmuifang), is a species of snake in the superfamily Colubroidea. It is endemic to Mizoram, India.

Etymology
The specific name hmuifang came in honor of the people of the Hmuifang village.

Description
The species can identified from Blythia reticulata, by having 114–117 ventral scales and 20–21 subcaudal scales in males. Smaller snakes have bright orange-red venter and older snakes have creamy venter.

References

hmuifang
Endemic fauna of India
Reptiles of India
Reptiles described in 2017
Snakes of Asia